Shaneh Tarash Mahalleh (also Romanized as Shāneh Tarāsh Maḩalleh; also known as Shāneh Tarāsh) is a village in Do Hezar Rural District, Khorramabad District, Tonekabon County, Mazandaran Province, Iran. At the 2006 census, its population was 74, in 23 families.

References 

Populated places in Tonekabon County